Rupert Myers (1921–2019) Sir Rupert Horace Myers KBE AO was the third vice-chancellor of the University of New South Wales, between 1969 and 1981

Rupert Myers may also refer to:
Rupert Myers (journalist), a British writer and host of Political Takeout